Sasha Zhoya (born 25 June 2002) is a French/Australian athlete who represents France in international track and field competition, specialized in hurdling events. Born in Australia, and of French and Zimbabwean descent, he represents France internationally.

He is the current holder of three world under-18 best performances (110 m hurdles, 60 m hurdles, pole vault) and two world U20 records (60 m hurdles, 110 m hurdles).

Early life and background
Sasha Zhoya was born on 25 June 2002 in Subiaco, locality of the southern suburbs of Perth in Australia, from a French mother Catherine Larbiose-Zhoya and a Zimbabwean father, Yonah Zhoya, so that he has the triple nationality Franco-Australian-Zimbabwean.

Raised in Australia, he began athletics at the age of 8 at Melville Little Athletics, where his mother was a coach, and joined the Australian Institute of Sport at age 14. He is trained by Lindsay Bunn for sprinting events, and by Paul Burgess and Alex Parnov for the pole vault.

He started training in France in 2017, at Clermont Athlétisme Auvergne, club of his mother's city of origin, where he is coached by Philippe d'Encausse for the pole vault.

Holder of three passports and competing in both Australian and French youth championships, Zhoya had to decide which country he will represent in competition. 
In 2020, he decided to compete for France. He joined the sprint-hurdles group of the French Athletics Federation at INSEP, supervised by Ladji Doucouré for the hurdles and Dimitri Demonière for the sprint events.

Career

Under-18
In 2018, at the French Junior Outdoor Championships in Bondoufle, Zhoya won the silver medal in the 100 metres and the gold medal for the 200 metres.

In February 2019, at the French Junior Indoor Championships in Liévin, he won two gold medals with two French national youth records, for pole vault with a 5.32 m vault and for the 60 metres hurdles with 7.48 seconds. It was his first competitive outing at the hurdles distance and equalled the youth record owned by Ladji Doucouré.

In April 2019, at the Australian Junior Championships, he broke the world under-18 record in pole vault with 5.56 m, one centimetre more than the Greek Emmanouíl Karalís in 2016.

In June 2019 at La Chaux-de-Fonds, he broke the French national youth record in the 100 m with 10.41 s (+1.4 m/s).

In July 2019, at the semi-final of French Junior Outdoor Championships in Angers, he broke the world under-18 record for the 110 meters hurdles with a time of 12.87 s (+1.6 m/s), improving by 9 hundredths the previous record of the Jamaican Jaheel Hyde set in 2014. He later won the final with 12.96 s. The next day, he also won the 200 m final and descended for the first time below 21 seconds, with 20.81 s but with wind assistance (+3.1 m/s).

A few days later, he broke the French national youth record in the 200 m in a meeting at Sotteville-lès-Rouen with 20.91 s.

Under-20
In 2020, at the French Junior Indoor Championship in Miramas, Zhoya broke the world under-20 record in the 60 m hurdles with 7.34 s in the final.

In July 2021, he improved his personal best over 110 m hurdles by posting 13.02 s in the semi-final of the French junior championships in Bondoufle. Zhoya then largely won the final in 13.06 s. A few days later, he won the European U20 Championships in Tallinn in 13.05 s, his first international title. In the semi-final, he ran in 12.98 s, which was below the junior world record, but with wind assistance (+2.4 m/s).

In August 2021, Zhoya won the 110 m hurdles final of the World U20 Championships in Nairobi, Kenya while setting a new world U20 record of the distance in 12.72 s.

Under-23
For his first season with senior height hurdles (106.7 cm), Zhoya won the 110 m hurdles final of the French Athletics Championships in 13.17 s (-0.5 m/s).  

He therefore participated at the 2022 World Athletics Championships in Eugene, Oregon, where he was eliminated in the semi-finals in 13.47 s. 

Zhoya also participated at the 2022 European Athletics Championships in Munich, where he fell when crossing the last hurdle and finished eighth.

Statistics

Personal records

National titles
 French Athletics Championships
 100 m: 2018 (U18)
 200 m: 2019 (U18)
 60 m hurdles (indoor): 2019 (U18), 2020 (U20)
 110 m hurdles: 2019 (U18), 2021 (U20), 2022
 Pole vault (indoor): 2019 (U18)
 Australian Athletics Championships
 200 m: 2017 (U16), 2019 (U18)
 110 m hurdles: 2017 (U17), 2019 (U18)
 Pole vault: 2017 (U17), 2019 (U20)

References

External links
 

2002 births
Living people
Athletes from Perth, Western Australia
French male pole vaulters
French male hurdlers
French male sprinters
French decathletes
Australian male pole vaulters
Australian male hurdlers
Australian male sprinters
Australian decathletes
World Athletics U20 Championships winners
French people of Zimbabwean descent
Australian people of French descent
Australian people of Zimbabwean descent
Sportspeople of Zimbabwean descent